Henry Steeger III (May 26, 1903 – December 25, 1990) was an American magazine editor and publisher. He co-founded Popular Publications in 1930, one of the major publishers of pulp magazines, with former classmate Harold S. Goldsmith. Steeger handled editorial matters while Goldsmith took care of the business side. Both were veterans of the pulp magazine business. Steeger had edited war pulps at Dell Publishing while Goldsmith had served as an editor at A. A. Wyn's Magazine Publishers.

Steeger's new firm launched four titles which debuted on the newsstands with cover dates of October 1930. Battle Aces was the only title to survive and more titles were produced with the ensuing months.

With Horror Stories and Terror Tales, Steeger started the "shudder pulp" (or "weird menace") genre. Although short lived, this genre was responsible for some of the most striking cover art of the Pulp Era. The over-the-top stories of torture and titillation however, led the public to look down on the fiction found in the pulp magazines.

Steeger created the long-running pulp character The Spider and published it as a Popular publication from 1933 to 1943. The series was published monthly and ran for 118 issues. (A 119th issue was published years later.) Steeger also edited (anonymously) the last issues of Black Mask. He died on Christmas Day, 1990 at age 87.

References

American pulp magazine publishers (people)
1903 births
1990 deaths
People from New York City